Kokborok (Tiprakok/Tripuri) is the native language of Tripuri people in present Tripura state in North East of India. During the 20th century many of Royal family and its officials contributes to develop the Kokborok language in many ways.

Historical record 

A significant hint for the antiquity of the Kokborok language can be found in the following lines in the "Rajmala", the chronicle written now in Bengali of the Kings of Tripura, which mentions that "Rajmala" was first written in Kokborok(Tiprakok):
Purbe Rajmala chhilo Tripur bhashate,
Payar Gathilo sob sokole bhujhite,
Su-bhashate Dharmaraje Rajmala Koilo,
Rajmala boliya lockete hoilo."
- Rajmala - 2nd part, Dharma Manikya Chapter, page 6.

The meaning of the quotation is - the Rajmala had been in Tripur language earlier. As ordered by the king Dharma Manikya, the chronicle was translated or written afresh in elegant language, i.e., in Bengali in the 14th century AD.

Written period 

Since the Rajmala was written there has been little written material in Kokborok and only since the end of the 19th century there has been some effort of writing the language in the written form. And from the second half of the 20th century only there has been a vigorous development process and activities for creating literature in Kokborok. The Tripura state Government had recognised Kokborok as a state language in 1979 only and since then important Govt. notifications are being published in Kokborok along with Bengali.

The development of Kokborok literature of the last century can be divided into the following periods:

Period-I 

First effort for giving the language in printed book form and creation of literature of language

Radhamohan Thakur wrote the grammar of Kokborok named "Kok-Borokma" published in 1900 AD. Beside he wrote two other books "Traipur Kothamala" and "Traipur Bhasabidhan". Traipur Kothamala was the Kokborok-Bengali-English translation book published in 1906 AD. The "Traipur Bhasabidhan" was published in 1907.

Daulot Ahmed was a contemporary of Radhamohan Thakur and was a pioneer of writing Kokborok Grammar jointly with Mohammad Omar. The Amar jantra, Comilla published his Kokborok grammar book "Kokbokma" in 1897 AD. The Education Gazette a renowned newspaper of that time made commendatory review on this book.

Period-II 

Tripura Janasiksha Samiti and the Kwtal Kothoma

After the works of Radhamohan Thakur and Daulot Ahmed, Khushikrshna a disciple of Ratnamani a well known personality to the people of Tripura contributed to a compilation of 33 spiritual songs in Kokborok under title "Tripura Kha-Khachangma Khumber Boi" and published it in 1942 AD.

On 27 December 1945 AD the "Tripura Janasiksha Samiti" came into being and it established many schools in different areas of Tripura. The first Kokborok magazine "Kwtal Kothoma" was first edited and published in 1954 by Sudhanwa Debbarma, who was a founder of the Samiti. Folk songs, Folk tales and articles were published in this magazine. Some mention-worthy writers and their topics published serially in the magazine were:

a) "Chethuang", a novel by Sudhanwa Debbarma.

b) "Phunukmung", collection of riddles in Kokborok.

c) "Gandhiji Koklam", a talk on Mahatma Gandhi by Dasrath Deb Barma.

During this period there were some other persons and activists who played a vital role for development of the Kokborok language and literature. Bangshi Thakur (Amarendra Deb Barma) became popular in Agartala town and rural areas for his composition of Holi (color festival) songs in Kokborok. he wrote many Kokborok poems, in 1948 AD, his "Koktang Kului" a brief Kokborok grammar and translation book was published. Sudhir Krishna Deb Barma was a renowned writer, vocalist and linguist. He wrote two books "Koktang" and "Surungma Yakhili" published in 1954 and 1962 AD respectively. Ajit Bandhu Deb Barma was a renowned man of literature and a journalist and is remembered for his innumerable writings and articles in newspapers. His book  "Kok-Surungma" (Bagsa and Bagnui) was published in 1963 AD and "Kokrobam" a Kokborok dictionary was published in 1967 AD. Mahendra Deb Barma published his textbook for children "Cherai Surungma" in 1958 AD. Alindralal Tripura was the founder of the "Kokborok Sahitya Sabha", he wrote a lot of books and plays, among those "Lamani Homchang" was performed in 1972. Sonacharan Debbarma composed songs in the 1950s and published them under the title "Firogoi Faidi". Books such as "Bharatni Panchali", "Ramayan Kocharjak" and "Yapri Kwtal" were also published by the State Education Department.

Period-III 

Movement for development of Kokborok language and creation of Kokborok literature in later parts of 1960s and 1970s

This part of the century witnessed a nationalistic movement led by the Twipra Students Federation, two organisations came into being in this period which extended mentionable help in the progress of development of Kokborok literature and culture, "Tripura Kokborok Unnayan Parishad" was established under Bir Chandra Deb Barma in 1967 AD. This organisation brought published a book "Tripura Kokborok Bhashar Likhito Rupe Uttaran" in 1972 AD. The other organisation was "Tripura Kokborok Sahitya Sabha founded by Sailendralal Tripura and Alindralal Tripura with this organisation published a book on Tripuri philosophy "Tripura Somhita in 1967 AD and "Srungsama" in 1973 AD, the latter was published by the Tripura Baptist Literature Society.

"Khani Ruchapmung" a collection of seventeen Kokborok songs by Budurai, "Kok-Borok Swrung" written in Roman script by Dasaratha Deb Barma in 1977 and "Bubar" by Monoranjan Deb Barma in 1978 were some of the notable publication of the 1970s.

Smai Kwtal 

But the biggest and greatest Kokborok literary work of this century was the "Smai Kwtal", the New Testament of the Bible in Kokborok language, published in 1976 AD by the Bible Society of India. The "Smai Kwtal" benchmarked all other works in the coming years and was the first popular literature to have seen the day-to-day use among the Tripuri community. It has gone through many reprints and revisions and is still always in demand due to which there is always a shortage in prints of the book.

Period-IV 

1980s focus of movement for Kokborok literature

In consequence of the education thrust by the "Tripura Janasiksha Samiti" and the literary organisations many educated Tripuri's became aware of their social obligation, and there has been a speedy flow in Kokborok literary movement and Kokborok was on way to be recognised as having a developed language and literature. The publication of Kokborok literature of different branches in this decade were:

Novels 

"Hachuk Khurio" (In the lap of Hills) by Sudhanwa Debbarma is the first modern Kokborok novel. It was published by the Kokborok Sahitya Sabha and Snskriti Samsad in 1987 AD. Also "Tongthai Naitungnani" (In search of above) by Shyamlal Deb Barma was published serially in Lama a literary magazine.

Short stories 

Dundurkma a compilation of 12 short stories by Shyamlal Deb Barma in 1984 and also Adong in 1987 edited by him. Nakhwrai a compilation of four stories by Benoy Deb Barma in 1987. Elemni Bibi a compilation of eight stories by Haripada Deb Barma in 1989.

Poetry 

Kok-Borok Koklob Bwchab (A collection of poems) in 1983 edited by Naresh Chandra Dev Varma and Shyamlal Deb Barma; Chhimalwng Chhakao Molongni Khum (Flower of stone on a crematorium) in 1984 by Nanda Kumar Deb Barma; Kogtang-Koklob Bwtang (collection of poems and rhymes) in 1983 and Muktwi by Santimoy Chakraborty. Luku Sochama Rwchabmung (Songs of the masses) by Mahendra Deb Barma in 1984. Ha Kwchak (Red Soil) 1983 and Nwng Hamjakma Rwya 1988 and also Ang bai Kwkharang twini khorang in 1986 and Rwchapmung by Sudhanya Tripura. Haping Garingo Chibuksa Ringo 1986 and Kolomtwi Kishi Mwkhang 1986 also Bolong Kwkhrang 1987 by Chandra Kanta Murasing. Sonnet Koktangrog by Benoy Deb Barma 1988. Kokila Nwng twmani aswk pung by Narendra Deb Barma 1988. Horni boro or Sangh tram panchali by Alindralal Tripura. Bolongni Bwsajwksong Nwsao by Nanada Kumar Deb Barma 1988 and Kok-Borok Gono Sangit by Shyamlal Deb Barma 1988.

Other 

Tripurani Kereng Kotoma 1980 by Santimoy Chakraborty and some of the translated books were Kok-Borok Geeta by Nanda Kumar Deb Barma 1988, Nok Arini Kothoma and Kok-Borok bai Rabindranath in 1987 by Shyamlal Deb Barma also Takhumsa Bodol by Narendra Chandra Deb Barma. Also many literary magazines were popular in this decade such as Lama of the Tripura Upajati Ganamukti Parishad, Chati of Kokborok Sahitya-O-Sanskriti Samsad and Dangdu of Tripura Rajya Kokborok Sahitya Sabha.

Period-V 

Last decade of the 20th century - Adolescence of Kokborok literature

Kokborok literature of different branches published in this decade deserved appreciation and compliment for their literary quality and standard. The publications are:

Novel 

Hachuk Khurio (In the lap of Hills), 2nd part,1994 by Sudhanwa Debbarma. Khong in 1996 by Shyamlal Deb Barma.

Short stories 

Belonia, 1994 by Nagendra Jamatia, Mokol Bwskango 1994 and Biyal 1997 and Chethuang Tolao 2000 by Snehamoy Roy Choudhury, Bolongni Khum 1996 and Busu 2000 by Sunil Deb Barma, Swkal jwkma 1998 by Bijoy Deb Barma, Naphurai Jamatia and Rabindra Kishore Deb Barma. Osthirog 2000 by Biswa Kumar Deb Barma, Jalai Tokpuku 200 by Haripada Deb Barma and Naithok 1998 by Naphurai Jamatia and Ashok Deb Barma.

Poetry 

Ani Ganao Ang and Ani Rwchabmung 2000 by Nanda Kumar Deb Barma, Himalayni Bedek Buprao 1991 and Love-ism 1995 by Chandramani Deb Barma, Dormo Lam boy Kok-Borok Baul 1992 by khajual Jamatia, Khumpui Barrwrwk 1995 by Kokborok tei Hukumu Mission, Vakharai 1996 by Kumud Ranjan Deb Barma, Nono Rikha Khumpui 1997 and Jaduni Khorang 200 by Sudhanya Tripura, Bolong Muphunjak Yakbai 1998 by Bikashroy Deb barma, Longtrainin Eklobyo 1998 by Bijoy Deb Barma, Lok Chethuang Lok 1999 and Pindi Uatwi Pin 1999 by Chandra Kanta Murasing, Sinijak Kwrwi Bumui 2000 by Kunja Bihari Deb Barma and Kokthiarog Swngo bonbonia 2000 by Shyamlal Deb Barma.

Others 

Some of the translation books were Komola Kantoni Doptar 1992 by Nagendra Deb Barma, Mangni Uansokthani Geeta 1997 by Annaprasad Jamatia and Lobmung Bwchab (Psalms) by Tripura Baptist Christian Union. Other prominent books are Kwrak Kothoma 1995 by Krishnadhan Jamatia, Anglo-Kokborok Dictionary 1996 by Binoy Deb Barma, Phukmung 1994 by Kokborok tei Hukumu Mission, Kokboroni Rangchak-richak 1994 by Binoy Deb Barma, Mahatma Gandhi 1995 by Sukanta Deb Barma, Kokborokni Kokrok Kisa 1996 by Nitai Acharjee, Sachlang Jorani Imangni Kumpui 1997 by Bimal Deb Barma, Kokborok Sikhum 1997 by Rabindra Kishore Deb Barma and Bemar Tai Bini Hamrimung 1999 by Nilmani Deb Barma.

21st century
A new dawn in Kokborok literature

The new century started with glittering hope for the language with publications of Kokborok Dictionary and the History Chronicle of the Tripura Kingdom, Rajmala, in Kokborok.

Dictionary

The 21st century began for Kokborok literature with the monumental work, the Anglo-Kokborok-Bengali Dictionary compiled by Binoy Deb Barma and published in 2002 A.D. by the Kokborok tei Hukumu Mission. This is the 2nd edition of his previous ground breaking dictionary published in 1996 and is a trilingual dictionary.

A concise Kokborok-English-Bengali Dictionary also by Binoy Debbarma was published in 2001 by the Language Wing, Education Department of Tripura Tribal Areas Autonomous District Council, Khumulwng.

General
Twiprani Laihbuma (The Rajmala - History of Tripura) translated by R.K Debbarma and published in 2002 AD by KOHM. Dr. B. R. Ambedkor 2001 by Chandra Bala Debbarma also by KOHM, Thangphlaihni Bithilwng (The Borok herbal medicine) 2002, Bubagratang (Rajmala) in 2009 by Atul Debbarma, Mao Tse Tung in 2014 by Shyamlal Debbarma, Bugrakotor Alekjanser in 2014 by Rabindra Kishore Debbarma.

Tales and Tunes of Tripura Hills: An anthology of Kokborok Folk Songs, Myths and Tales, Proverbs and Riddles.   The translated works by Poet Chandra Kanta Murasingh is the first book in Kokborok published by the Sahitya Akademi.

Novels
Rung (2001) by Nanda Kumar Debbarma, Mwnakni Pohor (2002) by Kunjabehari Debbarma, Langmani Rukungo (2003) by Sunil Debbarma, 1980 (2006) by Atul Debbarma, Tongthai Naitugwi (2007) by Shyamlal Debbarma,
Dolai Twima Naro 2008 by Bijoy Debbarma, KOHM and Lokhopoti (2010) by Sefali Debbarma.n

Short stories
Jalai Tokpupu (2000) by Haripad Debbarma, Basulam (2001) and Mo salni pohoro(2003)by Kunjabihari Debbarma, Imangni Yakhili 2001 by Narendra Debbarma, Yamroksa 2002 by Binoy Deb Barma, Holong Beserni Khum 2002 by Rebati Debbarma, Hachukni Muktwi (2002)by Rabindra Kishore Debbarma, Toksa Tiyari 2004, Toksa Hakaya (2006) by  Atul Debbarma, Phola Kaithamni Kothoma 2007,Kothomani Hayung (2010) by Gopal Debbarma,  Nokhaisa Kerang Kothoma 2011 by Bijoy Debbarma, Busu (2000) by Sunil Debbarma, Khumpui Barrwrwk Twiyung Torrwrwk (2014) and Hatal Khamchuru Bahai (2014) by Sefali Debbarma.

Poetry
Sana Muchungbo Sajakya Kokrok 2002	by Sona Charan Debbarma,  Kokthai Kwchambai Rwchapmung Kokblob 2006 by Mrinal Kanti Debbarma, Nono Rwkha Khumbubar Barsa 2006 by Dr. Sudhanya Debbarma, Rwchapmung Borok Jaduni 2006 by Kwlwi Debbarma, Nwng Rwchablangmani Kokthairok 2006 compiled by Bimal Debbarma, Mun Dodoro Mun 2010 by Narendra Debbarma, Dumburni Muktwi 2011 and Nini Rang Thaisa Buini Rang Khokba 2012 by Prasenjit Debbarma, Chokhreng 2012 by Binoy Debbarma.

Christian
The world's best selling book of the 21st century, the Purpose Driven Life by Rick Warren was published in the language in 2008. It was translated by L.N Siama and published by the North East India Harvest Network, Shillong.

Baibel Kwthar
The full Holy Bible in Kokborok language was finally published for the first time in the year 2013 by the Bible Society of India after the earlier publication of the New Testament in Kokborok called the Smai Kwtal in 1976.

The translation team of the Bible from the Tripura Baptist Christian Union (TBCU) were:
 Rev. Jong Bahadur Debbarma, CBA (who was also part of the previous Smai Kwtal translation team)
 Rev. Anil Debbarma, CBA
 Rev. Nilmani Debbarma, SNBA
 Mr. Mark Debbarma, CBA
Baibel Kwthar is currently the largest work and biggest book published in the language with more than 1,300 pages and is now the benchmark for publications in the language.

Translated Works
The Language Wing of the Tripura Tribal Autonomous Districts Council (TTAADC), Khumulwng has been instrumental in bringing out major translated works of books in other languages in Kokborok. Some of the major translations are  Veniceni Baniyasa (2007) by Jasuda Reang of Merchant of Venice by William Shakespeare, Gura (2007) by Laxmidhan Murasing of Gora by Rabindranath Tagore, Srikanta Part - I of Sarat Chandra Chattopadhyay (2009) by Shyamlal Debbarma, Robinson Crusoe in Kokborok (2009) by Purna Chandra Debbarma, Boltayerni Kandid (A translation of Candide of Voltaire in Kokborok) (2014) by Santosh Debbarma, Somerset Momni Kothomarok (2014) by Suprava Debbarma, etc.

Compilations
The new century saw publishing of many compilations of works of Kokborok authors of various genres of poetry, drama, short stories, essays and folk tales in single volumes such as:- An Anthology of Kokborok Poems (2009) by Binoy Debbarma, Rangbwtang (2011) by Dipankar Chakraborty, Surang (2014) and Suri (2015) by Suranjan Kundu Choudhury, Thungnuk Bwchap (2015) by Nanda Kumar Debbarma.

Post-Modern Period-VI 
Tipra Bisi Tei Lekhamung Raida (2020) by Mg. Narendra Debbarma
Tutankhamun ni Pyramid (2022)
Chirik Morok (2022): The Kokborok Poetry Anthology by Bikash Roy Debbarma and Nanda Kumar Deb Barma.

Present 
The present trend of development of the Kokborok literary works show that the Kokborok literature is moving forward slowly but steadily with its vivacity and distinctive originality to touch the rich literature of the rich languages.

See also 
 Tripuri people

References

Bibliography 
 Kokborok Literature - A century's development, by N.C. Deb Barma, "Tui" Magazine, Tribal research Institute, Agartala.
 Tripura-e Kokborok Chorcha, by Ramprasad Dutta.

External links 
www.kokborok.org Kokborok Literature website

Tripuri culture
Kokborok
Indian literature by language
Literature by language